Dobodura is a genus of beetles in the family Carabidae.

Species 
Dobodura contains the following six species:

 Dobodura alildablldooya Liebherr, 2017
 Dobodura armata Darlington, 1968
 Dobodura hexaspina Liebherr, 2017
 Dobodura obtusa Liebherr, 2017
 Dobodura svensoni Liebherr, 2017
 Dobodura toxopei Liebherr, 2017

References

Lebiinae